Dumb may refer to:

A human state
 Muteness, the condition of being unwilling or unable to speak
 Stupidity, a lack of intelligence

Songs
 "Dumb" (The 411 song), 2004
 "Dumb" (Faith Evans song), 2012
 "Dumb" (Nirvana song), 1993
 "Dumb" (Tich song), 2013
 "Dumb", by the Beautiful South from Quench, 1998
 "Dumb", by Bvndit, 2019
 "Dumb", by Garbage from Version 2.0, 1998
 "Dumb", by Jason Derulo from Future History, 2011
 "Dumb", by Jazmine Sullivan from Reality Show, 2015
 "Dumb", by Kelly Rowland, 2015
 "Dumb", by Royce da 5'9" from Book of Ryan, 2018
 "Dumb", by Todrick Hall from Straight Outta Oz, 2016

Other uses
 Dumb: The Story of Big Brother Magazine, a 2017 American documentary film

See also
 
 
 Deaf and dumb
 Dumbing down, the term referring to oversimplification of a topic
 Dummer (disambiguation)
 Dummy (disambiguation)